Skiri may refer to:

Sciri, an East Germanic tribe
Skidi, a sub-tribe of the Pawnee